"Mine" is the second and final single from Taproot's second studio album Welcome. Along with "Poem", the song is one of the band's most successful singles. A music video was released for the song and was directed by System of a Down bassist Shavo Odadjian.

Track listing

Charts

Personnel
 Mike DeWolf – guitar
 Phil Lipscomb – bass
 Jarrod Montague – drums
 Stephen Richards – vocals, guitar

References

2003 singles
Atlantic Records singles
Taproot (band) songs
2002 songs
Songs written by Stephen Richards (musician)